Wenxi Township is a rural township in Jingzhou Miao and Dong Autonomous County, Hunan, China. Miao and Dong people accounted for 37.5% and 37.5% of the total population respectively. It is surrounded by Shaxi Township of Huitong County on the northeast, Gantang Town on the northwest, Quyang Town on the southwest, Suining County on the southeast, and Zhaiya Township on the south.

History
After the establishment of the Communist State in 1950, Wenxi Township was set up. In 1958 it was renamed "Wenxi People's Commune". It restored the original name in 1984.

Administrative division
As of 2017, the township is divided into 13 villages: Lijiajie, Shangbao, Changxi, Baojiang, Hongling, Baochong, Jinma, Langxi, Wenpo, Wenxi, Xicun, Shuitun, and Xiabao.

Geography
The Muli River flows through the town southwest to northeast.

Mountains located adjacent to and visible from the townsite are: Mount Hongling, Mount Huanglian and Mount Dabaiyi.

Economy
The township's economy is based on nearby mineral resources and agricultural resources. Mineral resources include gold, alum and manganese. Gastrodia elata, wolfiporia extensa and edible mushroom are the economic crops in the township.

Transportation
The Provincial Highway S222 passes across the town northeast to southwest.

References

Townships of Huaihua
Jingzhou Miao and Dong Autonomous County